Chris Sawyer's Locomotion (often abbreviated to just Locomotion) is a video game designed and programmed by independent game developer Chris Sawyer, and published by Atari in September 2004. According to Sawyer, it is the "spiritual successor to Transport Tycoon". Like in its predecessor, the player takes on the role of a transportation company manager, building transportation networks and managing the flow of goods and passengers in order to compete against rival companies.

Gameplay
The game allows the player to use railroads, trams, trucking lines, buses, airplanes and ships to earn money in a transport company between the years 1900 to 2100. It contains over 40 pre-designed scenarios and a scenario editor, and can also be played in multiplayer mode with another human-controlled competitor. The game is played in an 2D isometric view like the other games by Chris Sawyer, particularly RollerCoaster Tycoon, which uses the engine that was originally developed for Transport Tycoon.

The scenarios have five difficulty levels: Beginner, Easy, Medium, Challenging and Expert. Different objectives are available, some require the player to finish on a certain position in the company ranking list while others require the transportation of a specific amount of cargo. In some cases these objectives have additional limits, such as that the player must finish within a certain time limit. While many of the scenarios are fictional, some are based on real-world countries such as the United States, Switzerland, and the United Kingdom.

In recent years, several add-ons have been created for the game, including hundreds of trains, trucks, airplanes and other vehicles. Some people have used special programs to convert Microsoft Train Simulator rolling stock for use in Locomotion.

Downloadable content
Early on in the game's development, some Japanese vehicles and buildings were created, only to be omitted from the published game. One of these vehicles was the Shinkansen 0 Series, which later became downloadable from Chris Sawyer's website. These Japanese assets were likely switched out for the Swiss ones.

Development
Locomotion was developed by game developer Chris Sawyer as "spiritual successor to Transport Tycoon". The game was published and released by Atari in the U.S. on September 7, 2004 and a few days later in the rest of the world.

In 2013, an Android and iOS version of Transport Tycoon was released, primarily based on Locomotion.

On March 17, 2015, the game was re-released through digital distribution on Steam and gog.com.

In January 2018, the open-source project OpenLoco was launched to enhance the gameplay of Locomotion. This  includes fixing bugs, translating the game to more languages, and allowing the game to run natively on macOS and Linux. Furthermore, OpenLoco features reduced limitations compared to the original, e.g. disabling vehicle breakdowns, unlocked building options, and using custom resolutions.

Reception

Reviews of the game were generally not favorable, with many noting that the game's user interface and AI were both poor in comparison to the original Transport Tycoon. Locomotion holds an average of 59/100 on aggregate website Metacritic.

See also
Sid Meier's Railroads!

References

External links
Chris Sawyer official website

Repository of OpenLoco at GitHub

2004 video games
Business simulation games
Assembly language software
Railroad business simulation video games
Transport business simulation games
Transport Tycoon
Video games developed in the United Kingdom
Video games scored by Allister Brimble
Video games scored by John Broomhall
Video games with isometric graphics
Windows games
Windows-only games